"Mush from the Wimp" was a joke headline at the top of an editorial in The Boston Globe that accidentally passed through to publication in 1980.

Headline
On March 15, 1980, The Boston Globe ran an editorial that began:

There was nothing exceptional about it except the headline, "Mush from the Wimp", which essentially called the speech "mush" and Carter a "wimp". The headline was corrected to read "All must share the burden" during the print run, but only after 161,000 copies had already gone to circulation.

Aftermath
The phrase had been created by Globe editorial writer Kirk Scharfenberg; in 1982, he wrote an op-ed piece discussing it. Scharfenberg had felt that Carter's speech was "wishy-washy" and it left him "not much impressed". "I meant it as an in-house joke and thought it would be removed before publication," he explained.  "It appeared in 161,000 copies of the Globe the next day."  Scharfenberg also noted the use of "wimp" as a popular political insult afterwards. He remained with the Globe until his death in 1992 from cancer at age 48.

A month after the headline was published, Theo Lippman Jr. of The Baltimore Sun declared "Mush from the Wimp" as being "on its way to becoming one of the most famous headlines of our time." He placed it behind "Wall St. Lays an Egg" (Variety, 1929) and ahead of "Ford to City: Drop Dead" (New York Daily News, 1975).

The phrase became well known enough that, in 1995, a Globe editorial chastising the Iditarod race for caving in to pressure from animal rights activists was titled "More wimps from the mush".

The New York Post used "Mush from the wimp", with credit to Scharfenberg, as the title of an opinion column published on June 20, 2013, criticizing President Obama following a speech in Berlin.

See also
 Although they are often confused, the Carter speech referred to by the Globe was on anti-inflation measures, https://www.presidency.ucsb.edu/documents/anti-inflation-program-remarks-announcing-the-administrations-program. It was not the famous Carter speech from the previous summer, referenced below. 
 "Malaise speech", common name for a televised address given by President Carter on July 15, 1979.

References

1980 in Boston
Cultural history of Boston
English phrases
Error
Headlines
History of mass media in the United States
March 1980 events in the United States
Mass media in Boston
Presidency of Jimmy Carter
The Boston Globe